The Palacio de La Moncloa before the Spanish Civil War was the old palace before it suffered damage during the Spanish Civil War, and after be rebuilt to the current Palacio de La Moncloa (being now the official residence for the Prime Minister of Spain) with a very different layout from the original.

History 
The current Palacio de La Moncloa is heir to an ancient farmhouse, located in the middle of a vast agricultural estate, through which have passed marquises, dukes and kings. It dates back to the first third of the 17th century, when Gaspar de Haro y Guzmán, Marquis of the Carpio and of Eliche, took over the orchards of La Moncloa and Sora, which were located in the vicinity of the Cantarranas stream.

At the highest point of the land, the Marquis ordered the construction of a mansion, originally known as the Palace of Eliche and also as Casa Pintada, in reference to the frescoes that adorned the outside walls. 

Apart from this fact, little is known of the original appearance of the building, but it presumably was designed with two floors and an attic, as is clear from an appraisal conducted in the 18th century. After passing through several owners, La Moncloa was bought in 1781 by María Ana de Silva, Duchess of Arcos, who undertook the first major reform of the palace, following the Neoclassical trends of the moment.

After her death in January 1784, the estate passed to her daughter, María del Pilar Teresa Cayetana de Silva, the popular Duchess of Alba portrayed by Goya. In 1802 the Duchess died, an occasion that was used by King Charles IV to buy the property, with the intention to annex it to the Royal Site of the Florida. Five years later it would add the Dehesa de Amaniel or de la Villa, next to La Moncloa, also acquired by the monarch.

In 1816 the building was restored by architect Isidro González Velázquez, who proceeded to its consolidation and the elimination of some ruinous elements, in addition to acting on the gardens. During the reign of Isabel II in 1846, the entire property was transferred to the Spanish State. At first it was under the jurisdiction of the Ministry of Development, until the decision was made to create a museum, which was inaugurated in 1929. The adaptation works were directed by Joaquín Ezquerra del Bayo.

The Civil War (1936–39) meant the virtual destruction of the property. Being in a ruinous state it was finally demolished during the government of Franco. In 1955 it was rebuilt, to be used as a residence for national and foreign personalities, mainly heads of state that are visiting Spain. The project, signed by Diego Méndez, posed a layout very far from the original. Was devised a building of new plant, with which the old farmhouse of eighteenth tastefully it transformed into a palace of great dimensions, based on models inspired in the Casa del Labrador, de Aranjuez, with touches of the architecture of the Austrias. Elements were even borrowed from other sites, such as the twelve columns of the old courtyard (actual Hall of Columns), coming from the cloister of the Archbishop's Palace of Arcos de la Llana near Burgos.

With the advent of democracy, the current Palacio de La Moncloa was turned into the official residence of the President of Government and his family.

Description 

The following analyzes the evolution of architectural and ornamental of the palace from the last third of the 18th century, when it reached its peak, until its destruction in the Civil War, stopping briefly on the contributions of its principal owners.

The Duchess of Arcos, the owner between 1781 and 1784, put special attention on the interiors. The rooms were decorated in pseudo-classical style with abundant Pompeii and Herculaneum motifs. This period corresponds to the Cabinet of the Stuccos and the Dining room, dominated by a Tribune of musicians, and the sumptuous staircase leading to the upper floor. In the next two decades, the Duchess of Alba continued the remodel initiated by her mother, while embellishing the gardens. The Garden del Cenador, the Pond of the New Fountain and the Pond of los Barbos were some of her contributions. While her greatest contribution was the huge cave built under the palace, where a dairy was available to supply milk products to the House of Alba. This basement survived to the Civil War and in it Felipe González established his famous "bodeguiya" (a cellar).

For his part, Charles IV did not make too many reforms. Still, a mahogany staircase was installed in the lobby and an office was created, for personal use of the sovereign, in one of the bedrooms.

In the time of Joseph Bonaparte, the decor was renewed. This task was undertaken by architect and painter Juan Digourc, of French origin. With regard to the restoration of Isidro González Velázquez, his work was decisive in stopping the deterioration process which was taking place in the palace, and also made some buildings of new fact, between them a House of Crafts. But, undoubtedly the most important restoration was undertaken between 1918 and 1929 by the Spanish Society of Friends of Art, under the direction of Joaquín Ezquerra del Bayo. This restoration was particularly thorough and sought to recover of the appearance that the palace had in the 18th century, as it was to be converted into a museum. So much was this spirit in mind that, for example, they managed to discover the Greek decoration the Duchess of Arcos had ordered to perform to her bedroom and front bedroom, hidden under different layers of paint.

The gardens of the estate deserve special mention, in which the prestigious painter and gardener Javier Winthuysen Losada intervened in 1922.

Gallery

See also 
 Palace of Moncloa

References

Bibliography 
 "La recuperación del palacete: una intensa historia." Juan Antonio González Cárceles, Presidency of the Government, Madrid, 2009.
 "Madrid, la Moncloa. María Teresa Fernández Talaya." Editions La Librería, Madrid, 2011.

Demolished buildings and structures in Madrid
Buildings and structures completed in the 17th century
Buildings and structures completed in 1784
Former palaces in Spain
Neoclassical palaces
Buildings and structures demolished in the 1930s
1930s disestablishments in Spain